Bjurholm Municipality is a municipality in Västerbotten County in northern Sweden. Its seat is located in Bjurholm.

The present municipality has the same territory as the one instituted in 1863, when the municipal system was implemented in Sweden. Between 1974 and 1983 it was, however, part of Vännäs Municipality. The split in 1983 made Bjurholm the least populated of all Swedish municipalities, and the population is still decreasing.

Locality

There is only one locality (or urban area) in Bjurholm Municipality:

Politics
Result of the 2010 election:
 Moderate Party 26,58%	
 Centre Party 14,13%
 Liberal People's Party 8,07%	
 Christian Democrats 6,50%	
 Swedish Social Democratic Party 36,15%	
 Left Party 	3,56%
 Green Party 1,94%
 Sweden Democrats 2,44%
 Other Parties 0,63%

Sister cities
Bjurholm Municipality has two sister cities:

 Bardu, Norway
 Kuivaniemi, Finland

Notable native
Warner Oland, actor

References

External links

Bjurholm Municipality  - Official site

Municipalities of Västerbotten County